Bennett David Hill (1934–2005) was a historian, a Benedictine monk and an author. He was born in Baltimore, Maryland and moved to Philadelphia, Pennsylvania when he was ten, and earned advanced degrees from Harvard University (A.M. in 1958) and Princeton (Ph.D. in 1963). He taught history at the University of Illinois at Urbana.

Hill was the author of English Monasteries and Their Patrons in the Twelfth Century (1968), Church and State in the Middle Ages (1970), and articles in Analecta Cisterciensia, New Catholic Encyclopedia, The American Benedictine Review and The Dictionary of the Middle Ages. He was one of the contributing editors of The Encyclopedia of World History (2001).

Among other publications Hill have made contributions to are A History of World Societies and A History of Western Society, both published in several editions.

Hill was a Fellow of the American Council of Learned Societies and served as vice president of the American Catholic Historical Association (1995–1996). A Benedictine monk of Saint Anselm's Abbey in Washington, D.C., he also taught at St. Anselm's Abbey School and was a visiting professor at Georgetown University.

References

1934 births
2005 deaths
Writers from Philadelphia
American Benedictines
Harvard University alumni
Princeton University alumni
University of Illinois Urbana-Champaign faculty